The  Manipur Progressive Secular Alliance (MPSA) (formarly known as Secular Progressive Front (SPF) or Secular Progressive Alliance (SPA)) is a political alliance in India. The alliance includes six parties on a basis of an 18-point Common Agenda.

Formation

Secular Progressive Front

The Leader of the Opposition and ex-Chief Minister of Manipur Okram Ibobi Singh formed the Secular Progressive Front. The Congress President Sonia Gandhi accepted its formation. The SPF was founded after the resignation of three Members of the Legislative Assembly (MLA) from the Bharatiya Janata Party, four from the National People's Party, one from the All India Trinamool Congress, and the withdrawal of one Independent from the National Democratic Alliance in Manipur on 17 June 2020.

On 18 June 2020, Singh said that the Indian National Congress had formed a coalition of like-minded parties in Manipur and called a special Assembly session to prove a majority.
The Secular Progressive Front met with Manipur's Governor Najma Heptulla to attempt to form a government in Manipur. The SPF also seeks the removal of the Speaker of the Manipur Assembly, Yumnam Khemchand Singh. However later the alliance didn't work & The SPF failed to form government in 2020.

MSPA formation
Later before the 2022 Manipur Legislative Assembly election the Congress rebranded the SPA alliance with new partners. The Congress allied with CPI, CPI(M), Forward Bloc, Revolutionary Socialist Party & the Janata Dal (Secular). On 5 February 2022 Congress manipur incharge Jairam ramesh announced that the new alliance will be called as Manipur Progressive Secular Alliance or simply the MPSA .

Current members

Members in Manipur assembly

The Front has the 5 members in the Manipur Legislative Assembly.

See also
Left and Secular Alliance
Left and Democratic Front
Secular Proggresive Front (2002-2012)

References

Citations

2020 establishments in Manipur
Political parties established in 2020
Political party alliances in India
Political parties in Manipur